Back to Front is the tenth album by English progressive rock band Caravan, released in 1982. Back to Front featured the original lineup of Richard Coughlan, Pye Hastings, Richard Sinclair and David Sinclair after 1971's In the Land of Grey and Pink and is the last studio album to feature that lineup.

Track listing 
Side one

Side two

Personnel 
Caravan
 Pye Hastings – lead vocals (tracks A2, B2-4), guitar; guitar solo (track B4)
 Dave Sinclair – piano, organ, Minimoog and Prophet synthesizers; lead vocals (track B1)
 Richard Sinclair – lead vocals (tracks A1, A3 & A4), bass guitar; guitar solo on "A.A. Man" (track A3)
 Richard Coughlan – drums and percussion; talking voice (track B4)

Additional personnel
 Saxophone solos by Mel Collins
 Recorded by Graeme Quinton-Jones and Jeremy Darby

Release information 
 LP Kingdom 5011    (1982)
 CD Eclectic 1010   (2004 remaster)
 CD Eclectic 230448 (2005 remaster)

References

External links 
 Caravan - Back to Front (1982) album review by Peter Kurtz, credits & releases at AllMusic.com
 Caravan - Back to Front (1982) album releases & credits at Discogs.com
 Caravan - Back to Front (1982) album credits & user reviews at ProgArchives.com

Caravan (band) albums
1982 albums